Edna Pengelly (5 July 1874 – 20 August 1959) was a New Zealand teacher, civilian and military nurse, matron. She was born in Canada in 1874 and came to New Zealand as a child. She attended primary schools in Waddington and Annat. She then attended Christchurch West School before boarding at Christchurch Girls' High School.

During World War 1 she served with the New Zealand Army Nursing Service in Egypt.

References

1874 births
1959 deaths
Canadian emigrants to New Zealand
New Zealand nurses
New Zealand schoolteachers
New Zealand military personnel
New Zealand women nurses